Anilio is an Aromanian village and a community of the Metsovo municipality. Since the 2011 local government reform it is part of the municipality Metsovo, of which it is a municipal district. The 2011 census recorded 587 residents in Anilio. The community of Anilio covers an area of 42.637 km2.

See also
 List of settlements in the Ioannina regional unit

References

Aromanian settlements in Greece
Populated places in Ioannina (regional unit)